Hvam is a village in Nes municipality, Norway. It is a part of the urban area Tomteråsen, which is located a few miles west of the urban area Årnes. Its population is 660.

References

Villages in Akershus
Nes, Akershus